Ruthton is an unincorporated community in Keith County, Nebraska, United States.

History
Ruthton got its start, following construction of the Union Pacific Railroad through the territory.

References

Populated places in Keith County, Nebraska
Unincorporated communities in Nebraska